Highway Patrol 2 (shown on the title screen as Highway Patrol II) is a racing video game published by Microïds in 1991 for Atari ST, Amiga, and MS-DOS compatible operating systems. The player is a police officer trying to capture criminals before they reach the border of the state. The game begins with choosing a target, each one with different rewards: the tougher the criminal, the higher the reward will be. The game is played in a first-person view, with a map and a compass to help in locating the criminal. To arrest him, players may choose to use the soft way (siren), or the hard way (shotgun).

Screenshots

Reviews
The Games Machine (Jun, 1990)
CU Amiga (Apr, 1990)
Amiga Joker (Mar, 1990)
Amiga Format (May, 1990)
Amiga Power (May, 1991)
Amiga Power (Jun, 1992)

References

External links
Highway Patrol 2 at Atari Mania
Microids

1991 video games
Amiga games
Atari ST games
DOS games
Microïds games
Racing video games
Video games about police officers
Video games developed in France